The United States Commercial Service (CS) is the trade promotion arm of the U.S. Department of Commerce's International Trade Administration. CS is a part of the U.S. Foreign Service and its commercial officers are diplomats. The CS global network of trade professionals helps thousands of U.S. companies to export goods and services worth billions of dollars every year. CS trade specialists are located throughout the United States, as well as in U.S. embassies and consulates in over 75 countries around the world. The mission of CS is to advance and protect strategic U.S. commercial and economic interests around the world.

Timeline

1903 The United States Department of Commerce and Labor is established, subsuming the State Department's Bureau of Foreign Commerce and the Treasury Department's Bureau of Statistics.

1911 The Bureau of Foreign and Domestic Commerce, the predecessor of the International Trade Administration, is created in the Department of Commerce and Labor.

1913 The Departments of Commerce and Labor become separate departments. The bill establishing the Department of Labor was signed on March 4, 1913, by President William Howard Taft.

1927 The Foreign Commerce Service is established by Act of Congress (March 3, 1927, Foreign and Domestic Commerce Act of 1927, also called the Hoch Act, 44 Stat. 1394) "for promotion of foreign and domestic commerce."  Trade commissioners are granted diplomatic status and retitled "commercial attaches".

1928 Ms. Addie Viola Smith is appointed Trade Commissioner of the Bureau of Foreign and Domestic Commerce, assigned to Shanghai. Smith was the first female Trade Commissioner in the bureau, was paid comparably to her male peers and received constant commendations on her work and diplomacy. Despite all this, she was still regarded as handicapped because of her gender.

1939 President Franklin D. Roosevelt abolishes the Bureau of Foreign and Domestic Commerce and all other non-State Department foreign services. The commercial officers are reabsorbed into State.

1979 In June, President Jimmy Carter signs the "Trade Agreements Act of 1979," which transfers overseas commercial programs from the Department of State to Commerce.

1980 The Foreign Commercial Service is established under the U.S. Department of Commerce. The name is changed to the U.S. & Foreign Commercial Service in 1981 in order to emphasize the linkage of domestic and overseas operations under a single organizational purpose.

1983 As international trade fairs are privatized, the Commercial Service begins the Certified Trade Fair Program to provide trade fair participants with a support network, a set of standards and official U.S. endorsement.

1985 The Matchmaker, one of the most popular Commercial Service programs, is launched. The program brings
small and medium-sized U.S. exporters into direct contact with foreign importers, resulting in hundreds of sales and contracts.

1990 The Gold Key Service, conceived in the late 1980s by the Commercial Service in Paris, becomes widely available to U.S. exporters in 1990. The GKS offers U.S. exporters custom-tailored overseas services. Today, the Gold Key Service is available in 104 countries and averages over 1,000 meetings per year.

1992 Funding from the 1992 Freedom Support Act and USAID helps create American Business Centers. The ABCs are designed to operate in the developing markets of Russia and the Newly Independent States to stimulate economic growth and create jobs in the U.S.

1993 The U.S.-Asia Environmental Partnership is formed. Working with USAID, the Commercial Service launches the
USAEP program to focus U.S. government resources on the quickly growing environmental products and services sector, in which U.S. companies excel.

1994 Four new CS offices open in Baltimore, Chicago, Long Beach and Miami, in order to provide better services to local businesses. (Over time, CS offices would increase in number, eventually serving local businesses in all 50 U.S. states.)

1994 The first Commercial Centers open in São Paulo in July, and Jakarta in November. Later, more centers open in Shanghai and Johannesburg. These facilities offer U.S. firms a place to take advantage of all Commercial Service programs and services, as well as rental office space, computers, fax and phone, and display space.

1995 The new Commercial Service's official logo is unveiled. The logo is suggestive of the flag of the United States in
motion. Three oversized stars represent the major components of the Commercial Service: the Office of International Operations; the Office of Domestic Operations; and Global Trade Programs.

1995 Commercial Service Teams are created to better leverage internal resources. Today, there are 18 Global Teams.  Fourteen represent major industry sectors while four regionally focused teams concentrate on trade promotion in Europe, Latin America, Asia, and Africa/Middle East.  The Global Teams network within the Commercial Service to bring together manpower and expertise from around the world to help US companies develop export markets.  The 18 teams are as follows:

Aerospace & Defense, ANESA (Africa, Near East, S. Asia), Agribusiness, Asia/Pacific, Automotive & Transportation, Education & Training, Energy, Environmental Technology,  Europe, Franchising, Healthcare Technology, Information & Communication Technology, Manufacturing, Publishing, Safety & Security, Textile & Apparel, Travel & Tourism, Trade Americas

1995 A United States Department of Commerce grant issued to the state of Georgia helps develop Commercial Service videoconferencing tools for client use. This service allows U.S. firms, especially those in rural areas, to meet with potential trading partners without the expense of international travel.

1996 The Commercial Service opens its first post in Hanoi. As the globalization phenomenon creates a new trading ethos, the Commercial Service helps U.S. businesses enter this and other developing markets.

1998 For the first time, an ambassadorship is offered to a member of the Commercial Service. George Mu, a senior commercial officer, accepts the position of ambassador to Côte d'Ivoire in 1998.

1998 The Commercial Service moves aggressively into the Internet world when it broadcasts its first webcast, "Mexico and Canada: Doing Business with our Friendly Neighbors." Webcasting becomes a popular method for delivering timely information to Commercial Service clients.

1998 The Embassy Nairobi bombing in August kills 213 people, and blinds Commercial Service Officer Ellen Karas (Bomer).

1998 The first CS office located on Native American Tribal lands opens in Ontario, California. The San Manuel tribe sees CS support as a "future for our children." The partnership with the tribe is one of many efforts to assist underserved groups.

2000 The CS celebrates 20 years of successful U.S. export promotion.

2000-2004 Increasing U.S. Exports Through Trade Promotion: from 2000 to 2004 the CS helps companies create a yearly average of 11,613 export transactions. Of these successes, 90 percent are generated by small and medium-sized businesses. The Advocacy Center helps U.S. businesses generate an annual average of $134 million in export sales during this period. New Markets, New Challenges: CS responds to the changing global economy by focusing its resources on where U.S. companies want to be now, and where they need to be in the future. New offices are opened in Iraq, China, Central America and sub-Saharan Africa. New One-Stop Shop for Trade Promotion at Commerce: In 2004, the CS assumes responsibility for all Commerce Department trade promotion activities. As a result of this reorganization, the CS now directs the Advocacy Center; the Trade Information Center; and Business Information Centers for China, the Middle East, the Newly Independent States and the countries of Central and Eastern Europe. Thanks to this consolidation, theCS network is now able to offer U.S. businesses a broader array of information and support services in the emerging markets of today

2010-2016 From 2010 to 2016, the Commercial Service's assistance to U.S. businesses played a significant role in achieving over $300 billion in U.S. exports and over $23 billion in inward foreign direct investment supporting an estimated 1.7 million American jobs.

2018 The Gold Key Service is modernized to help U.S. exporters find marketing partners more efficiently, leading to more accurate matches, faster fullfilment times and reduced costs for the agency.

Gold Key Matching Service
The Gold Key Matching Service is a fee-based service available to U.S.-based companies to introduce U.S.-made products to potential agents, distributors, sales representatives, association and government contacts, licensing or joint venture partners, end-users and other strategic business partners in the U.S. company's targeted export market. Typically the U.S. company makes application through their local CS office, which then works with one or more CS offices located in U.S. embassies or consulates outside the United States. With the service, a US based trade specialist, a foreign based commercial officer and commercial specialist will research potential business partners, select the most promising according to such factors as matching product lines, reputation and country coverage, provide the U.S. company's representative with an appointment schedule of one or more days of one-on-one meetings in the foreign country, and accompany the U.S. representative to the meetings.

See also
 Agreement on Trade-Related Aspects of Intellectual Property Rights
 Doha Round
 Generalized System of Preferences
 International Trade Administration
 International Trade Commission
 Office of the United States Trade Representative
 World Trade Organization

References

External links
U.S. Commercial Service homepage

Government agencies established in 1927
Commercial Service
Commercial Service
1927 establishments in the United States
1980 establishments in the United States
United States